Grievous Bodily Harm is a 1988 Australian crime film.

Grievous Bodily Harm may also refer to:

Grievous bodily harm, a term used in English criminal law
"Grievous Bodily Harm" (Lie to Me), a 2009 television episode

See also
GBH (disambiguation)